Innisai Mazhai is a 1992 Indian Tamil-language romantic musical film directed by Shoba Chandrasekhar. The film stars Neeraj, Parveen, Vivek and newcomer Sudhakar. It was released on 12 April 1992.

Plot 

Vijay, Mamta, Michael and Saravanan are members of a musical troupe. Michael and Saravanan are in love with Mamta, while Mamta loves Vijay. Vijay hates love and rejects her love, shaken by his words, Mamta tries to commit suicide. Vijay's father brought him up alone and he doesn't even know his mother. So his father reveals that his mother is, in fact, Michael's mother. Finally, Vijay understands Mamta's love and accepts her love.

Cast 

Neeraj as Vijay
Parveen as Mamta
Vivek as Michael
Sudhakar as Saravanan
Vinodh as Surish
S. A. Chandrasekhar
Jai Ganesh as Sabesan, Mamta's father
Prasanna as Vijay's father
Sangeetha as Michael's mother
Sudha as Mamta's mother
Kumarimuthu
Ganeshrao
Jayabaal
Joseph
Super Subbarayan
Ajay Rathnam

Soundtrack 
The music was composed by Ilaiyaraaja, with lyrics written by Vaali.

Reception 
Mayilai Sridharan in his review for Kalki praised the music and locations but panned the script and acting.

References

External links 

1990s romantic musical films
1990s Tamil-language films
1992 films
Films scored by Ilaiyaraaja
Indian romantic musical films